Pelmatochromis is a small genus of fishes in the cichlid family. Of its three species, two are endemic to the Middle Africa, and one is endemic to tropical West Africa. This genus is sometimes placed in its own clade, informally referred to as the pelmatochromines, and this as the Pelmatochromini, may be the sister taxon to the Chromidotilapiini.

Species
There are currently three recognized species in this genus:
 Pelmatochromis buettikoferi (Steindachner, 1894)
 Pelmatochromis nigrofasciatus (Pellegrin, 1900)
 Pelmatochromis ocellifer Boulenger, 1899

References

Chromidotilapiini
Cichlid genera
Taxa named by Franz Steindachner